USS John E. Kilmer (DDG-134) is a planned  guided missile destroyer of the United States Navy, the 84th overall for the class. The ship was authorized for construction by Bath Iron Works on 27 September 2018. On 16 October 2019, U.S. Secretary of the Navy Richard V. Spencer announced that the ship will be named in honor of United States Navy Hospital corpsman John E. Kilmer, who was killed in the Battle of Bunker Hill during the Korean War and posthumously awarded the Medal of Honor for his heroic actions in the battle.

References

 

Arleigh Burke-class destroyers
Proposed ships of the United States Navy